OTO Award TV Host

Currently held by  Adela Banášová

First awarded  | Last awarded 2014 | Present  

OTO Award for TV Host has been bestowed to the most recognized television host of the past year in Slovakia. As a newly established category of the awards show, the opening winner of the category will be announced live during the upcoming 15th OTO Awards ceremony to be held on March 14, 2015.

Winners and nominees

2010s

Superlatives

References

External links
 OTO Awards (Official website)
 OTO Awards - Winners and nominees (From 2000 onwards)
 OTO Awards - Winners and nominees (From 2000 to 2009)

Host
Slovak culture
Slovak television awards
Awards established in 2000